Autocharis marginata is a species of moth of the family Crambidae described by Christian Guillermet in 1996. It is found on Réunion and Seychelles  in the Indian Ocean, and in Mali.

It has a wingspan of 15 mm.

Visually this species looks very close to Autocharis hedyphaes.

References

Odontiinae
Moths described in 1996
Moths of Asia